William Melvin Clinton (November 23, 1888 – death date unknown) was an American Negro league outfielder in the 1910s.

A native of Vineland, New Jersey, Clinton played for the Bacharach Giants in 1917. In 16 recorded games, he posted eight hits and six RBI in 57 plate appearances.

References

External links
Baseball statistics and player information from Baseball-Reference Black Baseball Stats and Seamheads

1888 births
Year of death missing
Place of death missing
Bacharach Giants players
Baseball outfielders
Baseball players from New Jersey
People from Vineland, New Jersey